Note — Several annual sporting events did not take place in 1939, because of the outbreak of World War II.

1939 in sports describes the year's events in world sports.

Alpine skiing
FIS Alpine World Ski Championships
9th FIS Alpine World Ski Championships are held at Zakopane, Poland.  The events are a downhill, a slalom and a combined race in both the men's and women's categories.  The winners are:
 Men's Downhill – Hellmut Lantschner (Germany)
 Men's Slalom – Rudolf Rominger (Switzerland)
 Men's Combined – Josef Jennewein (Germany)
 Women's Downhill – Christl Cranz (Germany)
 Women's Slalom – Christl Cranz (Germany)
 Women's Combined – Christl Cranz (Germany)

American football
 NFL Championship – the Green Bay Packers won 27–0 over the New York Giants at Milwaukee's Dairy Bowl
 Sugar Bowl (1938 season):
 The Texas Christian Horned Frogs won 15–7 over the Carnegie Tech Tartans to win the college football national championship
NBC broadcast the game on station W2XBS with Bill Stern as the sole announcer.

Association football
England
 First Division – Everton win the 1938–39 title.
 FA Cup – Portsmouth beat Wolverhampton Wanderers 4–1.
 The outbreak of World War II means all competitive football in England is suspended in September, and the 1939–40 season cancelled. Various regional leagues and cups are set up in place of normal Football League and FA Cup competition.
Spain
 La Liga – not contested due to the Spanish Civil War
Germany
 German football championship – won by Schalke 04
Italy
 Serie A – won by Bologna
Portugal
 Primeira Liga – won by F.C. Porto
France
 French Division 1 – won by FC Sète.

Athletics
 September 17 – Taisto Mäki breaks the 10,000 m world record, becoming the first man to run the distance inside half an hour.

Australian rules football
 Victorian Football League
 Melbourne wins the 43rd VFL Premiership, defeating Collingwood 21.22 (148) to 14.11 (95) in the 1939 VFL Grand Final
 Brownlow Medal awarded to Marcus Whelan (Collingwood)
 South Australian National Football League
 30 September – Port Adelaide win their thirteenth SANFL premiership, defeating West Torrens 16.28 (124) to 11.11 (77).
 Magarey Medal won by Jeff Pash (North Adelaide) and Ray McArthur (West Adelaide)
 Western Australian National Football League
 7 October – Claremont win their second successive premiership, defeating East Fremantle 14.11 (95) to 11.10 (76)
 Sandover Medal won by Haydn Bunton, Sr. (Subiaco)

Baseball
 January 24 – Hall of Fame election – The goal of 10 initial inductees from the 20th century is finally met as voters select George Sisler, Eddie Collins, and Willie Keeler.
 May 2 – Cap Anson, Buck Ewing, Charles "Hoss" Radbourn, Albert Spalding, Charles Comiskey, and Candy Cummings are named to the Hall of Fame by a special committee, just weeks before the Hall opens. Along with the previous selections of Cy Young and Keeler in the writers' elections, Anson, Ewing and Radbourn arguably complete the 5 initial inductees from the 19th century which were promised but long delayed; Spalding, Comiskey and Cummings were largely elected as pioneers and contributors.
 May 2 – Lou Gehrig's streak of 2130 consecutive Major League Baseball games played comes to an end. The record will stand for 56 years before Cal Ripken Jr. breaks it.
 June 12 – The National Baseball Hall of Fame and Museum is dedicated in Cooperstown, New York.
 July 4 – Gehrig announces his retirement from the game at Yankee Stadium after being diagnosed with a terminal illness.
 August 26 – The first televised major–league baseball game is Brooklyn's 6–1 victory over Cincinnati at Ebbets Field.
 World Series – New York Yankees defeat Cincinnati Reds, 4–0.
 The Winnipeg Maroons win the Northern League championship.
 Little League Baseball is formed in Williamsport, Pennsylvania as a three–team league.
 December – A special election results in Gehrig being selected to the Hall of Fame; he had announced his retirement after the Hall's June opening.

Basketball
NBL Championship

Akron Firestone Non-Skids win three games to two over the Oshkosh All-Stars

Events
 March 22 – Undefeated LIU tops undefeated Loyola of Chicago in the championship game of the second annual National Invitation Tournament, 44–32.  LIU's 24–0 final record is the first perfect season of college basketball's postseason tournament era.
 March – The first NCAA Tournament is played.  On March 27, the University of Oregon defeats Ohio State University 46–33 in Evanston, Illinois, to become the inaugural champions of this tournament.
 The third European basketball championship, Eurobasket 1939, is won by Lithuania.
 The seventh South American Basketball Championship in Rio de Janeiro is won by Brazil.

Boxing
Events
 June – World Light Heavyweight Champion John Henry Lewis retires undefeated, his title later being claimed by Billy Conn
Lineal world champions
 World Heavyweight Championship – Joe Louis
 World Light Heavyweight Championship – John Henry Lewis → vacant → Billy Conn
 World Middleweight Championship – vacant
 World Welterweight Championship – Barney Ross → Henry Armstrong
 World Lightweight Championship – Henry Armstrong → Lou Ambers
 World Featherweight Championship – vacant → Joey Archibald
 World Bantamweight Championship – Sixto Escobar → vacant
 World Flyweight Championship – Peter Kane → vacant

Cricket
Events
 29 May – Northamptonshire gains (over Leicestershire at Northampton) their first victory for 99 matches, easily a record in the County Championship. Their last Championship victory was as far back as 14 May 1935 over Somerset at Taunton.
 23 August – The threat of war causes the West Indian touring team to preemptively cancel its last six matches and return home
 2 September – The British declaration of war causes all remaining first-class matches to be cancelled. No further first-class games would be played in England until 19 May 1945.
England
 County Championship – won by Yorkshire
 Minor Counties Championship – won by Surrey Second Eleven 
 Most runs – Len Hutton 2,883 @ 62.67 (HS 280 not out)
 Most wickets – Tom Goddard 200 @ 14.86 (BB 9–38)
 England defeat West Indies one Test to nil with two draws
 Wisden Cricketers of the Year – Learie Constantine, Bill Edrich, Walter Keeton, Brian Sellers, Doug Wright
Australia
 Sheffield Shield won by South Australia
 Most runs – Bill Brown 1,057 @ 105.70 (HS 215 not out)
 Most wickets – Chuck Fleetwood-Smith 30 @ 39.73 (BB 7–144)
India
 Bombay Pentangular – Hindus
 Ranji Trophy – Bengal beat Southern Punjab by 178 runs
South Africa
 Currie Cup – Transvaal
 England defeat South Africa one Test to nil with four draws
New Zealand
 Plunket Shield – won by Auckland

Cycling
Tour de France
 Sylvère Maes wins the 33rd Tour de France
Giro d'Italia
 Giovanni Valetti of Fréjus wins the 27th Giro d'Italia

Figure skating
 World Figure Skating Championships:
 Men's champion – Graham Sharp, Great Britain
 Ladies' champion – Megan Taylor, Great Britain
 Pair skating champion – Maxi Herber & Ernst Baier, Germany

Golf
Men's professional
 Masters Tournament – Ralph Guldahl
 U.S. Open – Byron Nelson
 British Open – Dick Burton
 PGA Championship – Henry Picard
Men's amateur
 British Amateur – Alex Kyle
 U.S. Amateur – Bud Ward
Women's professional
 Women's Western Open – Helen Dettweiler
 Titleholders Championship – Patty Berg

Horse racing
Steeplechases
 Cheltenham Gold Cup – Brendan's Cottage
 Grand National – Workman
Hurdle races
 Champion Hurdle – African Sister
Flat races
 Australia – Melbourne Cup won by Rivette
 Canada – King's Plate won by Archworth
 France – Prix de l'Arc de Triomphe – not held due to World War II 
 Ireland – Irish Derby Stakes won by Mondragon
 English Triple Crown Races:
 2,000 Guineas Stakes – Blue Peter
 The Derby – Blue Peter
 St. Leger Stakes –  no race
 United States Triple Crown Races:
 Kentucky Derby – Johnstown 
 Preakness Stakes – Challedon
 Belmont Stakes – Johnstown

Ice Hockey
 Boston Bruins won 4 games to 1 over the Toronto Maple Leafs to win the Stanley Cup

Motorsport

Nordic skiing
FIS Nordic World Ski Championships
 12th FIS Nordic World Ski Championships 1939 are held at Zakopane, Poland

Rowing
The Boat Race
 1 April — Cambridge wins the 91st Oxford and Cambridge Boat Race

Rugby league
1938–39 European Rugby League Championship
1939 New Zealand rugby league season
1939 NSWRFL season
1938–39 Northern Rugby Football League season / 1939–40 Northern Rugby Football League Wartime Emergency League season

Rugby union
 52nd Home Nations Championship series is shared by England, Ireland and Wales
 France is readmitted to the championship after the 1939 series is completed but will be unable to take part again until 1947 due to the suspension of international rugby during World War II

Snooker
 World Snooker Championship – Joe Davis beats Sidney Smith 43–30

Speed skating
Speed Skating World Championships
 Men's All-round Champion – Birger Wasenius (Finland)
 Women's All-round Champion – Verné Lesche (Finland)

Tennis
Australia
 Australian Men's Singles Championship – John Bromwich (Australia) defeats Adrian Quist (Australia) 6–4, 6–1, 6–3
 Australian Women's Singles Championship – Emily Hood Westacott (Australia) defeats Nell Hall Hopman (Australia) 6–1, 6–2
England
 Wimbledon Men's Singles Championship – Bobby Riggs (USA) defeats Elwood Cooke (USA) 2–6, 8–6, 3–6, 6–3, 6–2
 Wimbledon Women's Singles Championship – Alice Marble (USA) defeats Kay Stammers Bullitt (Great Britain) 6–2, 6–0
France
 French Men's Singles Championship – Don McNeill (USA) defeats Bobby Riggs (USA) 7–5, 6–0, 6–3
 French Women's Singles Championship – Simonne Mathieu (France) defeats Jadwiga Jedrzejowska (Poland) 6–3, 8–6
USA
 American Men's Singles Championship – Bobby Riggs (USA) defeats Welby Van Horn (USA) 6–4, 6–2, 6–4
 American Women's Singles Championship – Alice Marble (USA) defeats Helen Jacobs (USA) 6–0, 8–10, 6–4
Events
 Alice Marble wins Wimbledon Ladies' Singles, Doubles and Mixed Doubles, US Open Women's Singles, Doubles and Mixed Doubles, as well as Associated Press Athlete of the Year.
Davis Cup
 1939 International Lawn Tennis Challenge –  3–2  (15) Merion Cricket Club (grass) Haverford, United States

Awards
 Associated Press Male Athlete of the Year – Nile Kinnick, College football
 Associated Press Female Athlete of the Year – Alice Marble, Tennis

Notes
Awarded retrospectively by the SANFL in 1998.

References

 
Sports by year